Baeonoma mastodes is a moth of the family Depressariidae. It is found in French Guiana.

The wingspan is 15–19 mm. The forewings are white with a rather thick suffused dark fuscous streak along the costa from the base to beyond the middle and a rounded-triangular dark fuscous blotch on the middle of the dorsum, reaching half across the wing. There is a slight spot of fuscous irroration on the end of the cell. There is a variable rounded blotch of dark fuscous irroration or suffusion extending over the termen. The hindwings are grey.

References

Moths described in 1916
Baeonoma
Moths of South America
Taxa named by Edward Meyrick